Mastakh (Mastaax) is a rural locality (a selo) and the administrative center of Lyuchcheginsky 2-y Rural Okrug of Kobyaysky District in the Sakha Republic, Russia, located  from Sangar, the administrative center of the district. Its population as of the 2010 Census was 617; up from 577 recorded in the 2002 Census.

References

Notes

Sources
Official website of the Sakha Republic. Registry of the Administrative-Territorial Divisions of the Sakha Republic. Kobyaysky District. 

Rural localities in Kobyaysky District